Maritime Theatre Command (MTC), previously referred to as Peninsular Command, is a proposed integrated tri-services command of the Indian Armed Forces whose responsibilities may include the command and control of the entire Indian naval fleet and coastal defence operations. It is envisioned to include assets from all the branches of the Indian military. The commander of the MTC will be an Indian Navy officer who will report to the Joint Chiefs of Staff Committee headed by the Chief of Defence Staff (CDS).

History 
In 2001, the Andaman and Nicobar Command (ANC) was raised as an planned precursor to the MTC. According to India Today, this plan could not fructify due to the turf rivalries between the branches of the Indian military and a lack of will in India's political leadership. An Indian military plan published in 2017, the ‘Joint Forces Doctrine’, called for integrated commands like the MTC. The subsequent appointment of the CDS started the process of realising this doctrine. In 2020, a detailed study to implement the MTC was prepared by the Indian Navy.

The MTC will be a first of its kind since it will reduce the powers that the Indian naval chief will have over the naval fleet.

Overview 
The MTC may be headquartered at INS Kadamba. The commander of the MTC may be a vice-admiral or admiral from the Indian Navy. The MTC will incorporate the ANC, the Western Naval Command, the Eastern Naval Command, and may be given the command and control of the Indian Coast Guard. The command may become operational by 2022.

Around two amphibious brigades of the Indian Army, consisting of around 12,000 soldiers, will be placed under the MTC. These brigades are stationed at Port Blair and Thiruvananthapuram respectively. Moreover, Indian Air Force fighter aircraft including Su-30MKIs, Tejas and Jaguars will be placed under MTC's command.

See also 

 Air Defence Command (India)

References 

Joint military units and formations of India
Military of India